In linear algebra, let  be a  complex matrix. The comparison matrix  of complex matrix A is defined as

See also 
 Hurwitz matrix
 P-matrix
 Perron–Frobenius theorem
 Z-matrix
 L-matrix
 M-matrix
 H-matrix (iterative method)

References 

Matrices